John Cauchi  is an Australian lawyer who served as the Attorney General of Tonga from 2009 to 2010.

Career
Cauchi graduated with a master's degree in criminology from the University of Sydney in 1995.

He has had extensive work experience in the South Pacific, from being senior crown counsel with Tonga's Crown Law Department in the 1990s to being senior advisor to the public prosecutor's office in Vanuatu from 2001 to 2003, and Director of Public Prosecutions in the Solomon Islands, from 2004 to 2006.

Cauchi was appointed as Tonga's Attorney General on 25 May 2009. In April 2010, he resigned, citing government interference in the country's legal system.  He was the first Attorney General of Tonga not to hold the post of Minister of Justice at the same time. He succeeded 'Alisi Afeaki Taumoepeau. Following his resignation he sued the Tongan government for breach of contract, seeking $480,000 in damages.

In Australia he has served as a senior prosecutor in the Australian Capital Territory and as principal crown counsel in the office of the DPP in Tasmania (during 2009).

Honours
Cauchi was appointed to the status of Senior Counsel in a special session of the Supreme Court in Nuku’alofa, held on 30 June 2009.

He was appointed a Member of the Order of Australia in the Queen's Birthday Honours in June 2015 for significant service to the law, and to international relations, through leading public administration and legal roles in the South Pacific.

Personal life
He is an Australian citizen.

References

Year of birth missing (living people)
Living people
Attorneys General of Tonga
20th-century Australian lawyers
Australian expatriates in the Solomon Islands
Government of the Solomon Islands
21st-century Solomon Islands lawyers
Australian expatriates in Tonga
Members of the Order of Australia
21st-century Australian lawyers